Canora Beach is a hamlet in the RM of Good Lake No. 274, Canadian province of Saskatchewan. The hamlet is located on the north-eastern shore of Good Spirit Lake and is accessed from Township Road 303, which is off of Highway 746. The town of Canora is  approximately 15 km west to the east.

Canora Beach Resort is located on the north side of the community.

See also 
 List of communities in Saskatchewan
 List of hamlets in Saskatchewan

References 

Good Lake No. 274, Saskatchewan
Unincorporated communities in Saskatchewan
Canora, Saskatchewan
Division No. 9, Saskatchewan